Holidaymaker is a seasonal publication produced by Cambrian News, for publicising tourism attractions and activities in parts of Wales. Since 2009, Holidaymaker can be viewed for free as an online publication.

Content
A full colour print, it lists attractions, activities and ideas of what to do and where to go. Produced in three regional editions covering: Ceredigion & Mid-Wales; Gwynedd; and Pembrokeshire; it is printed in three editions in spring, Easter and summer.

References

External links
Holidaymaker Website
My Peru Guide Website

Free magazines
Tourism in Wales
Tourism magazines
Magazines with year of establishment missing
Magazines with year of disestablishment missing
Online magazines published in the United Kingdom
Online magazines with defunct print editions
Magazines published in Wales